Krysten Alyce Ritter (born December 16, 1981) is an American actress and model. She came to prominence in 2009–2010 as the character Jane Margolis in the AMC drama series Breaking Bad; a role she reprised in the 2019 spinoff film El Camino. She also had lead roles in the ABC sitcom Don't Trust the B---- in Apartment 23 (2012–2013) and the Netflix superhero series Jessica Jones as the title character (2015–2019), also featured  in the Netflix miniseries The Defenders (2017).

Early life
Ritter was born in Bloomsburg, Pennsylvania, the daughter of Garry Ritter and Kathi Taylor. She was raised in rural Shickshinny, Pennsylvania, where her mother, stepfather and sister live; her father lives in nearby Benton. She is of German, Scottish, and English descent. She graduated from Northwest Area High School in 2000.

Career

Modeling
Ritter was scouted by a modeling agent at the age of 15 at her local shopping center, the Wyoming Valley Mall, during a modeling event. In a Philadelphia Style magazine interview, Ritter said she was "tall, gawky, awkward, and really, really skinny." While in high school, she traveled to New York City and Philadelphia to model, and signed with the Elite Model Management agency and Wilhelmina Models. Ritter moved to New York and established an international modeling career, appearing in print ads and on television. She did magazine, catalog, and runway work in Tokyo, New York, Paris, and Milan.

Acting
An audition Wilhelmina had placed her in for a Dr Pepper television commercial helped Ritter transition into acting. Her "outgoing and bubbly and funny" performance personality had entertained the casting people, she told Philadelphia Style. She won bit parts in films starting in 2001, and played a 1950s art history student in Mona Lisa Smile in 2003. In 2006, she appeared in All This Intimacy, a two-act, Off-Broadway play by Rajiv Joseph, at the Second Stage Theatre. (Ritter later starred in the 2011 premiere of Zach Braff's play All New People, also at Second Stage, co-starring Anna Camp, David Wilson Barnes and Justin Bartha and directed by Peter DuBois.)

Ritter's early guest starring and recurring roles on television included Gia Goodman, the daughter of Mayor Woody Goodman (Steve Guttenberg) on the second season of Veronica Mars; Rory Gilmore's friend, Lucy, on Gilmore Girls for eight episodes in 2006-07; and the first iteration of Allison Stark on the Fox sitcom 'Til Death (a role eventually played by four different actresses through the show's run).
 

She was cast as a young Carol Rhodes in an episode of The CW's teen drama series Gossip Girl, titled "Valley Girls," broadcast May 11, 2009. The episode was a backdoor pilot for a proposed spin-off series, set in 1980s Los Angeles; intended to chronicle the teenage years of character Lily van der Woodsen. Ritter described Carol, Lily's sister, as "the outcast" and "an '80s Sunset Strip rocker" to Access Hollywood. The series was not picked up by the network for the 2009–10 season, by which time Ritter appeared as Jane Margolis in the second season of Breaking Bad.

Ritter continued working in film, often cast in romantic comedies as the lead character's best friend. After supporting roles in What Happens in Vegas and 27 Dresses (both 2008), she co-starred with Isla Fisher in Confessions of a Shopaholic. For She's Out of My League, shot over three months in Pittsburgh in 2008, she played Patty, the cynical best friend of Alice Eve's character, Molly. Ritter also starred in How to Make Love to a Woman, based on the book by adult film star Jenna Jameson; and co-starred (with Jason Behr) in the 2009 independent film The Last International Playboy, as Ozzy, a drug addict. 

Also in 2009, Ritter sold a television pilot she wrote based on her experiences as a model, titled Model Camp; and appeared in and directed the comedy web series Woke Up Dead, also featuring Jon Heder.

Ritter starred in 2010 as the sharp and quirky Lily in the Starz television series Gravity, alongside Ivan Sergei, Ving Rhames and Rachel Hunter. The comedy-drama centers on a group of outpatient suicide survivors. She also played the manager of an Irish band in the 2011 comedy Killing Bono, a film directed by Nick Hamm and based on the book Killing Bono: I Was Bono's Doppleganger, about the early days of U2. Beginning in January 2010, the film shoot lasted for six weeks in locations from Belfast to London.

Ritter starred in and co-wrote (with director Kat Coiro) the 2011 independent comedy Life Happens, with Kate Bosworth and Rachel Bilson. The film is about two best friends dealing with the pregnancy and subsequent motherhood of Ritter's character.
That same year, Ritter appeared alongside Alicia Silverstone and Sigourney Weaver in the comedy horror film Vamps, written and directed by Amy Heckerling. She plays a Manhattan socialite turned into a vampire. 
In February 2011, Ritter landed the lead role in the ABC situation comedy Don't Trust the B---- in Apartment 23. She starred as Chloe, a New York City party girl and con artist who attempts to rip off her new roommates after they move in, but befriends and mentors one of the applicants. The series was canceled on January 22, 2013, after two seasons.

Ritter went on to star in two NBC television comedy pilots in 2013 and 2014 that were not picked up as network series. She played Nora in the pilot for Assistance, based on the play by Leslye Headland. Her casting as aerospace engineer Dr. Mary Kendricks in the astronaut-themed comedy Mission Control was announced by the network in February 2014; but on October 15, NBC said it was not moving forward with the show.

A July 9, 2013, press release stated Ritter would star in Jake Hoffman's directorial debut, Asthma, about the indie rock scene in New York City. 

On December 5, 2014, Ritter was cast to star in the Marvel Television series Jessica Jones in the title role, as a former superhero turned private investigator. About her casting, executive producer and show-runner Melissa Rosenberg stated that Ritter "brings both the hard edge and the vulnerability the role demands". Ritter revealed she read the comic book to prepare for the role and expressed her delight on working with women. All 13 episodes of the first season premiered on Netflix on November 20, 2015. Ritter later reprised the role on The Defenders alongside Charlie Cox as Matt Murdock / Daredevil, Mike Colter as Luke Cage and Finn Jones as Danny Rand / Iron Fist, and returned for the second season of Jessica Jones in 2018. She directed an episode in the third season of Jessica Jones, marking her directorial debut.

Other ventures
Ritter and her childhood friend William Thomas Burnett formed the indie rock duo Ex Vivian, for which Ritter sings and plays guitar. Their self-titled debut album was released in 2012 on Burnett's WT Records. Ritter's debut novel, a psychological thriller titled Bonfire, was released on November 7, 2017, by Crown Archetype.

Personal life
Ritter moved from Brooklyn to Los Angeles in 2007. She promotes animal rights, posing for PETA ad campaigns, including a campaign warning pet owners of the dangers of leaving animals in vehicles during the summer, and another against SeaWorld keeping orcas in captivity. She is an avid knitter, and has appeared on the cover of Vogue Knitting.

Ritter was in a relationship with musician Adam Granduciel from August 2014 to late 2021. Their son was born on July 29, 2019.

Filmography

Film

Television

As a director

Web

Audio

Music videos

Discography
 Ex-Vivian (2012)

Bibliography

Accolades

References

External links

 
 
 
 
 
 

1981 births
21st-century American actresses
21st-century American women guitarists
21st-century American guitarists
21st-century American women singers
21st-century American singers
Actresses from Pennsylvania
American female models
American women singer-songwriters
American film actresses
American stage actresses
American people of English descent
American people of German descent
American people of Scottish descent
American television actresses
Guitarists from Pennsylvania
Living people
People from Luzerne County, Pennsylvania
Singer-songwriters from Pennsylvania